Pterocyrtus is a genus of beetles in the family Carabidae, which was first described in 1920 by Thomas Gibson Sloane.  It contains the following species:

 Pterocyrtus cavicola Moore, 1994
 Pterocyrtus globosus Sloane, 1920
 Pterocyrtus grayi Eberhard & Giachino, 2011
 Pterocyrtus meridionalis Eberhard & Giachino, 2011
 Pterocyrtus rubescens Sloane, 1920
 Pterocyrtus striatulus Sloane, 1920
 Pterocyrtus tasmanicus (Castelnau, 1867)
 Pterocyrtus truncaticollis Sloane, 1923

Distribution 
Species of this genus are found only in Victoria and Tasmania.

References

External links
Pterocyrtus Occurrence data from GBIF

Trechinae
Taxa named by Thomas Gibson Sloane
Taxa described in 1920